Albert James "Soldier" Carson (August 22, 1882 – November 26, 1962) was a professional baseball player who played pitcher in the Major Leagues in 1910. He played for the Chicago Cubs.

References

External links

1882 births
1962 deaths
Major League Baseball pitchers
Chicago Cubs players
Tacoma Tigers players
Portland Beavers players
Vernon Tigers players
Portland Colts players
Baseball players from Chicago